Lawrence Township may refer to:

Arkansas
 Lawrence Township, Lawrence County, Arkansas, in Lawrence County, Arkansas

Illinois
 Lawrence Township, Lawrence County, Illinois

Indiana
 Lawrence Township, Marion County, Indiana

Kansas
 Lawrence Township, Cloud County, Kansas
 Lawrence Township, Osborne County, Kansas, in Osborne County, Kansas

Michigan
 Lawrence Township, Michigan

Minnesota
 Lawrence Township, Grant County, Minnesota
 Lawrence Township, Itasca County, Minnesota

New Jersey
 Lawrence Township, Cumberland County, New Jersey
 Lawrence Township, Mercer County, New Jersey

Ohio
 Lawrence Township, Lawrence County, Ohio
 Lawrence Township, Stark County, Ohio
 Lawrence Township, Tuscarawas County, Ohio
 Lawrence Township, Washington County, Ohio

Pennsylvania
 Lawrence Township, Clearfield County, Pennsylvania
 Lawrence Township, Tioga County, Pennsylvania

South Dakota
 Lawrence Township, Charles Mix County, South Dakota, in Charles Mix County, South Dakota
 Lawrence Township, Roberts County, South Dakota, in Roberts County, South Dakota

Township name disambiguation pages